Joe Hicks is the name of:
 
 Joe Hicks (baseball) (born 1933), American baseball player
 Joe Hicks (musician), American R&B and soul blues singer and songwriter
 Joe R. Hicks (1941–2016), African-American conservative activist

See also
 Joe Hicks Tipton, MLB catcher
 Hicks (surname)